Minuscule 218 (in the Gregory-Aland numbering), δ 300  (Soden), is a Greek minuscule manuscript of the Old Testament (Septuaginta) and New Testament, on parchment. It is one of the few manuscripts with the complete Greek Bible. Palaeographically it has been assigned to the 13th century. It has marginalia.

Description 

The codex contains the text of the both Testaments, on 623 parchment leaves (size ), with some lacunae (Rev. 13:5-14:8; 15:7-17:2; 18:10-19:15; 20:7-22:21). The text is written in two columns per page, 50-52 lines per page. The text of New Testament is on leaves 486-623.

The order of books: Acts, Catholic epistles, Pauline epistles. Epistle to the Hebrews is placed between 2 Thessalonians and 1 Timothy.

The text of the Gospels has also another division according to the smaller Ammonian Sections, but without references to the Eusebian Canons.

Text 

The Greek text of the New Testament of this codex is a representative of the Byzantine text-type (except epistles). Aland placed it in Category III in the Catholic and Pauline epistles and in Category V in rest of New Testament books. It contains many peculiar readings.

According to the Claremont Profile Method it represents textual family Kx in Luke 1 and Luke 20. In Luke 10 no profile was made. It creates textual cluster with minuscule 187.

History 

The manuscript was brought from Constantinople to Vienna by Busbecq (like codex 123 and 434). It was examined by Treschov, Alter and Birch. C. R. Gregory saw it in 1887.

It is currently housed at the Austrian National Library (Theol. Gr. 23), at Vienna.

See also 

 List of New Testament minuscules
 Biblical manuscript
 Textual criticism

References

Further reading 

 F. C. Alter, Novum Testamentum ad Codicum Vindobonensem Graece expressum (Vienna, 1786-1787).

Greek New Testament minuscules
13th-century biblical manuscripts
Septuagint manuscripts
Biblical manuscripts of the Austrian National Library